RS Coronae Borealis is a semiregular variable star located in the constellation Corona Borealis with a parallax of 2.93mas being a distance of . It varies between magnitudes 8.7 to 11.6 over 332 days.  It is unusual in that it is a red star with a high proper motion (greater than 50 milliarcseconds a year).  Located around 1072 light-years distant, it shines with a luminosity approximately 1839 times that of the Sun and has a surface temperature of 3340 K.

References

Corona Borealis
Semiregular variable stars
M-type giants
Coronae Borealis, RS
143347
078235
Durchmusterung objects